Chris McCray (born May 27, 1984 in Capitol Heights, Maryland) is an American professional basketball player. He formerly played for the Milwaukee Bucks of the NBA.

A 6'5", 205 lb shooting guard, he attended and played basketball collegiately at the University of Maryland, but dismissed from the team after he was found academically ineligible. He was not selected in the 2006 NBA Draft, but signed a free agent contract with the Milwaukee Bucks in September 2006, making the team's 15-player roster.

In August 2005 McCray was involved in a street fight on campus at the University of Maryland, College Park, and he was jailed a night for refusing to leave the scene and resisting arrest. Charges of disturbing the public peace, resisting arrest and escaping from custody were later dropped.

Notes

External links
French League profile
D-League statistics
Chris McCray player profile @ NBA.com
McCray in search of redemption by Jon Siegel, The Washington Times, May 26, 2006

1984 births
Living people
American expatriate basketball people in Belgium
American expatriate basketball people in France
American expatriate basketball people in Italy
American men's basketball players
Basketball players from Maryland
BC Oostende players
Dakota Wizards players
Maryland Terrapins men's basketball players
Milwaukee Bucks players
People from Capitol Heights, Maryland
Shooting guards
Sioux Falls Skyforce players
Undrafted National Basketball Association players